What's That Sound? Complete Albums Collection is a box set of albums by the American rock band Buffalo Springfield. Released by Rhino Records in June 2018, the set contains the three original albums officially released by Atco—mono and stereo versions of the first two albums, Buffalo Springfield and Buffalo Springfield Again, and the stereo version of the last album, Last Time Around.

Track listing

Disc One: Buffalo Springfield (Mono Version)
"Go and Say Goodbye"
"Sit Down I Think I Love You"
"Leave"
"Nowadays Clancy Can't Even Sing"
"Hot Dusty Roads"
"Everybody's Wrong"
"Flying on the Ground Is Wrong"
"Burned"
"Do I Have to Come Right Out and Say It"
"Baby Don't Scold Me"
"Out of My Mind"
"Pay the Price"
"For What It's Worth"

Disc Two: Buffalo Springfield (Stereo Version)
"For What It's Worth"
"Go and Say Goodbye"
"Sit Down I Think I Love You"
"Nowadays Clancy Can't Even Sing"
"Hot Dusty Roads"
"Everybody's Wrong"
"Flying on the Ground Is Wrong"
"Burned"
"Do I Have to Come Right Out and Say It"
"Leave"
"Out of My Mind"
"Pay The Price"

Disc Three: Buffalo Springfield Again (Mono Version)
"Mr. Soul"
"A Child's Claim to Fame"
"Everydays"
"Expecting to Fly"
"Bluebird"
"Hung Upside Down"
"Sad Memory"
"Good Time Boy"
"Rock & Roll Woman"
"Broken Arrow"

Disc Four: Buffalo Springfield Again (Stereo Version)
"Mr. Soul"
"A Child's Claim to Fame"
"Everydays"
"Expecting to Fly"
"Bluebird"
"Hung Upside Down"
"Sad Memory"
"Good Time Boy"
"Rock & Roll Woman"
"Broken Arrow"

Disc Five: Last Time Around (Stereo Version)
"On The Way Home"
"It's So Hard to Wait"
"Pretty Girl Why"
"Four Days Gone"
"Carefree Country Day"
"Special Care"
"The Hour of Not Quite Rain"
"Questions"
"I Am a Child"
"Merry-Go-Round"
"Uno Mundo"
"Kind Woman"

Personnel
Buffalo Springfield:
Richie Furay – Guitar, Vocals, Vocals (background), Producer
Dewey Martin – Clarinet, Drums, Horn, Saxophone, Vocals, Executive Producer
Jim Messina – Bass, Producer, Engineer
Bruce Palmer – Bass
Stephen Stills – Organ, Bass, Guitar, Percussion, Piano, Piano (Electric), Tambourine, Vocals, Vocals (background), Handclapping, Producer, Remixing
Neil Young – Guitar, Harmonica, Piano, Arranger, Vocals, Vocals (background), Producer, Remixing

Others:
Joel Bernstein – Artwork, Compilation, Photography, Research, Text
Hal Blaine – Drums
Don Blake – Mixing
Bruce Botnick – Engineer
William E Brittan – Engineer
Gary Burden – Art Direction, Design
James Burton – Dobro
Jimmy Karstein – Drums
Charlie Chin – Banjo
Merry Clayton – Choir, Chorus
David Crosby - backing vocal on "Rock & Roll Woman"
Richard Davis – Bass
Ahmet Ertegun – Producer
Cyrus Faryar – Percussion
Jim Fielder – Bass
James Gordon – Strings, Horn (English)
Jim Gordon – Drums, Tympani [Timpani], Vibraphone
Charles Greene – Producer
Doug Hastings - Guitar
Jessie Hill – Drums, Tympani [Timpani]
Jim Hilton – Engineer
Brenda Holloway – Choir, Chorus
Patrice Holloway – Choir, Chorus
Jim Horn – Clarinet
Carol Kaye – Banjo, Bass, Dobro, Fiddle, Piano, Strings, Drums, Horn, Vibraphone
Bill Lazarus – Engineer	
Gary Marker – Bass
Sherlie Matthews – Choir, Chorus
Tom May – Engineer
Buddy Miles – Drums
Tim Mulligan – Remixing
Harvey Newmark – Bass
Gracia Nitzsche – Choir, Chorus
Jack Nitzsche – Arranger, Piano (Electric), Producer
Don Randi – Organ, Piano, Harpsichord
Mac Rebennack – Piano
Stan Ross – Engineer
Doc Siegel – Engineer
 Armin Steiner – Engineer
Brian Stone – Producer
Jeromy Stuart – Calliope, Harpsichord, Bells
Bruce Tergesen – Engineer
Russ Titelman – Guitar
Bobby West – Bass
Rusty Young – Pedal Steel

References 

Buffalo Springfield compilation albums
Rhino Records compilation albums
2001 compilation albums
Albums produced by Charles Greene (producer)
Albums produced by Brian Stone